The 2021 AFC Champions League Final was the final of the 2021 AFC Champions League, the 40th edition of the top-level Asian club football tournament organized by the Asian Football Confederation (AFC), and the 19th under the current AFC Champions League title.

The final was contested as a single match between Al-Hilal from Saudi Arabia and Pohang Steelers from South Korea. Prior to the match, both teams were joint most successful teams in the AFC Champions League, with three titles each. Al-Hilal won the match 2–0 and clinched their fourth title, becoming the outright most successful team in the history of the competition. They also qualified for the 2021 FIFA Club World Cup in the United Arab Emirates.

Teams
In the following table, the finals until 2002 were in the Asian Club Championship era, and since 2003 in the AFC Champions League era.

Notes

Venue
On 20 October 2021, the AFC announced that Mrsool Park would host the final. It was later changed to King Fahd International Stadium, also in Riyadh.

Road to the final

Note: In all results below, the score of the finalist is given first (H: home; A: away; *: played in centralized group locations).

Format
The final was played as a single match. If tied after regulation time, extra time and, if necessary, a penalty shoot-out would have been used to decide the winning team.

Match

Notes

References

External links
, the-AFC.com
AFC Champions League 2021, stats.the-AFC.com

2021
Final
November 2021 sports events in Asia
International club association football competitions hosted by Saudi Arabia
Al Hilal SFC matches
Pohang Steelers matches